KBDJ-LP (97.1 FM, "KBDJ 97.1") is a radio station licensed to serve the community of Waterloo, Iowa. The station is owned by Humanity's Hope Foundation, Inc., and airs an urban contemporary format.

The station was assigned the KBDJ-LP call letters by the Federal Communications Commission on October 30, 2015.

References

External links
 Official Website
 FCC Public Inspection File for KBDJ-LP
 

BDJ-LP
BDJ-LP
Radio stations established in 2017
2017 establishments in Iowa
Urban contemporary radio stations in the United States
Black Hawk County, Iowa